Thomas Jung (born 9 January 1969) is a German rower who competed for the SC Dynamo Berlin / Sportvereinigung (SV) Dynamo.

Jung was born in 1969 in Berlin. He won the medals at the international rowing competitions.

References 

German male rowers
Living people
1969 births
World Rowing Championships medalists for East Germany
World Rowing Championships medalists for Germany
Rowers from Berlin
20th-century German people